My Father Is a Hero (released in the United States and United Kingdom as The Enforcer and Jet Li's The Enforcer) is a 1995 Hong Kong action film starring Jet Li and the late superstar Anita Mui, directed by Corey Yuen, who also co-stars in the film. The film was released in Hong Kong on 2 March 1995.

Plot
Kung Wei, a police officer of the People's Republic of China, is assigned to spy on a group of Hong Kong terrorists. Despite his worries about his sick wife, who suffers from severe asthma, and his eight-year-old son Ku Kung, a martial arts student, Wei's duty interferes with his familial relationship.

Wei is partnered with Darkie, a gang member who formerly worked for a gang leader named Po. Wei and Darkie escape from prison to meet with Po in Hong Kong. Wei is inducted into the gang and participates in an arms deal with foreign criminals. Utilizing a ruse to steal the bombs and keep the money in Po's hands, Wei volunteers to wear a bomb-laden vest to facilitate the operation. The recent operation attracts the attention of an off-duty Hong Kong detective Anne Fong, whose boyfriend, Inspector Cheng, was taken hostage. Fong volunteers herself as a hostage exchange and attempts to foil the operation with an attempted suicide, but Wei intervenes in disabling the vehicle and escaping the scene. Utilizing a photo of Wei that was taken before the arms deal, Fong heads to Beijing to discover his true identity.  Back in Beijing, school bullies tease Ku. Fong befriends the Wei family, and deduces Wei's role as a police officer. During her time with the family, Mrs. Wei suffers from a fatal asthma attack, requests Fong to deliver a letter to Wei, and charges her with taking care of Ku.

Anne and Ku planned to travel to Hong Kong by speed boat, informing Inspector Cheng of her recent findings. However, against Fong's wishes, Cheng files a case of Ku missing, which attracts publicity from local media and results in a break-up between the couple. When Ku noticed a police cruiser in front of Fong's apartment, Ku escapes and is picked up by Po.  Meanwhile, Wei attempts to sneak in Fong's apartment to recover Ku, but is confronted by Fong before receiving his wife's final letter. Wei is reunited with his son at the gang penthouse but fakes Ku's death with a special choke before he is dumped inside a trash bag. Wei covertly informs Fong of Ku's whereabouts as a Plan B in case he fails to save him.  Wei attempts to rescue Ku, only to find out that Po deduced Wei's identity as a cop, since Wei was too skilled compared to the rest of his gang. Wei gets into a losing fight with Po until Fong's intervention. While Fong gives Wei medical care, Ku was recovered by Darkie before Wei's attempted search.

The next day, Po instructs his gang to plant six bombs marked by security cameras at an antique auction attended by rich people. The gangs are restricted from firearms but provided with tonfas instead and also the tickets to access on board. As a means of tying up loose ends, Po and his gang raid Darkie's house-boat, having suspected his role in recovering Ku. Darkie hides Ku from Po's sight before being mortally wounded; Darkie tells Ku about Po's scheme and gives him a mobile phone to contact Wei. Utilizing a beeper number that Wei gave him before his assignment, Ku informs Wei and reveals the bombs' locations. However, before the final bomb can be defused, the phone's batteries die. During the auction, Po attempts to rob the crowd, only to be interrupted by Wei and Ku.

A large melee battle pits the father and son against Po and his men. The pair score a victory against Po's men. Po takes Ku hostage by choking him. Ku uses his breathing exercise to delay the choke until Fong intervenes by shooting Po aboard a helicopter. Fong and Wei try to evacuate Ku off the boat via the helicopter, but Po arms the timer of the last bomb and pins Wei down with a chain while Fong and an unconscious Ku escape. Wei eventually gets out of the pin and knocks Po out, narrowly escaping the boat's explosion and reuniting with Fong and Ku.

Cast
Jet Li as Kung Wei 
Anita Mui as Inspector Anne Fong Yat-wa
Xie Miao as Johnny Kung Ku
Yu Rongguang as Po Kwong
Sing Ngai as Thug
Low Houi-kang as Thug
Damian Lau as Inspector Cheng
Corey Yuen as Bartender
Blackie Ko as Darkie

Release
My Father Is a Hero was released in Hong Kong on 2 March 1995. In the Philippines, the film was released with the same name by Asia Films on 22 November 1995.

Home media 
The Mei Ah Laserdisc contains a scene where Po Kwang and his thug (Collin Chou) speculate Kung Wei being an undercover cop. It occurs before the scene where Little Ku appears on the news. Versions maintaining the original score that exclude this scene contain a jump in the audio.
Indian distributor Diskovery released the export English version on VCD. It is cut, however.
Mei Ah released a non-remastered DVD with Cantonese and Mandarin soundtracks with English and Chinese subtitles.
In the US, My Father Is A Hero was re-edited/scored/dubbed and released as The Enforcer by Dimension Films in 2000. No option for the original Cantonese audio was included. The same version of the film was released in the UK on DVD in 2004 by Hollywood Pictures (the VHS in 2002).
A remastered anamorphic DVD was released by Mei Ah in 2005. Like a number of Mei Ah's "mono" soundtracks, it's a downmix of the 5.1 audio.
In 2009, Dragon Dynasty released a Special Edition of the film with new additional features. However, the Dimension cut and soundtrack had been preserved, making this the first Dragon Dynasty release that does not feature the original language soundtrack (with exception to 'My Young Auntie').
Also in 2009, an Austrian DVD by MIB was released featuring the uncut Hong Kong version with its original mono Cantonese soundtrack and newly remastered English subtitles - among the extras are trailers and a deleted scene (the aforementioned Laserdisc).

Reception 
At the Hong Kong box office, the film grossed .

In the United Kingdom, the film (released as Jet Li's The Enforcer) was watched by  viewers on television in 2004, making it the year's eighth most-watched foreign-language film on television (below seven other Hong Kong action films).

Critical reception
Rotten Tomatoes, a review aggregator, reports that 54% of 13 surveyed critics gave the film a positive review; the average rating is 5.3/10.  Joey O'Bryan of The Austin Chronicle rated it 2.5/5 stars and wrote of Li and Tse that "there is an unevenness at work here that keeps the film from reaching the delirious heights of this dynamic duo's previous collaborations".  Bill Gibron of PopMatters rated it 8/10 stars and wrote, "In fact, it’s the thrills and character interaction that makes The Enforcer much more than a stereotypical trip through the Asian underworld."  Earl Cressey of DVD Talk rated it 4/5 stars and wrote that it "combines some fantastic martial arts action and a decent story with great results".   David Johnson of DVD Verdict called it a "disappointing action movie" and wrote that he could not accept a child who fights against adult henchmen.

See also
Jet Li filmography
List of Hong Kong films

References

External links

1995 films
1995 action thriller films
1995 martial arts films
1990s Cantonese-language films
Films directed by Corey Yuen
Films shot in Hong Kong
Hong Kong action thriller films
Hong Kong martial arts films
Kung fu films
Triad films
Wushu films
1990s Hong Kong films